The FAI Cup 1930–31 was the tenth edition of Ireland's premier cup competition, The Football Association of Ireland Challenge Cup or FAI Cup. The tournament began on 28 December 1930 and concluded on 9 May 1931 with the final replay held at Dalymount Park, Dublin. An official attendance of 10,000 people watched Shamrock Rovers claim the third of five FAI Cup titles in a row by defeating Dundalk.

First round

Second round

Semi-finals

Replay

Final

Replay

Notes
A.  From 1923-1936, the FAI Cup was known as the Free State Cup.

B.  Attendances were calculated using gate receipts which limited their accuracy as a large proportion of people, particularly children, attended football matches in Ireland throughout the 20th century for free by a number of means.

References
General

External links
FAI Website

1930-31
1930–31 in Irish association football
FAI Cup